"Sex, Love & Money" is a single by rapper Mos Def, released as the lead single from his second album, The New Danger. The video was directed by Paul Hunter. It was nominated for a Grammy Award, and reached the Billboard Hot R&B/Hip-Hop Songs chart.

Single tracklist

A-Side
 Sex, Love & Money (Radio) (3:48)
 Sex, Love & Money (Instrumental) (4:09)
 Sex, Love & Money (LP Version) (4:09)

B-Side
 Ghetto Rock (Radio) (3:35)
 Ghetto Rock (Instrumental) (3:52)
 Ghetto Rock (LP Version) (3:53)

References

2004 singles
Mos Def songs
Song recordings produced by Warryn Campbell
Songs written by Warryn Campbell
Songs written by Mos Def
Geffen Records singles
2004 songs

Music videos directed by Paul Hunter (director)